Mike Balado is an American college basketball coach who was last the head coach at Arkansas State University. He was formerly an assistant coach at the University of Louisville.

Head coaching record

References

External links
 Mike Balado Bio - Arkansas State Athletics Official Web Site - astateredwolves.com (at Archive.org)

Living people
Basketball coaches from Florida
American men's basketball players
Arkansas State Red Wolves men's basketball coaches
Augusta Jaguars men's basketball coaches
Basketball players from Miami
College men's basketball head coaches in the United States
FIU Panthers men's basketball coaches
Florida Atlantic Owls men's basketball coaches
High school basketball coaches in Florida
High Point Panthers men's basketball coaches
Junior college men's basketball coaches in the United States
Louisville Cardinals men's basketball coaches
Miami Hurricanes men's basketball coaches
Sports coaches from Miami
St. Thomas Bobcats men's basketball players
Year of birth missing (living people)